Megan Oster (born July 14, 1989) is an American former competitive figure skater. She is the 2006–07 Junior Grand Prix Final bronze medalist.

For the 2007–08 season, Oster received two Grand Prix assignments, the 2007 Skate Canada International and 2007 NHK Trophy, but withdrew from both due to injury. She placed 5th at the Upper Great Lakes Regional Championships, and did not advance to Sectionals. She announced her retirement from competitive skating on July 1, 2008.

Programs

Competitive history
GP: Grand Prix; JGP: Junior Grand Prix

References

External links

 

Living people
American female single skaters
1989 births
Sportspeople from Kenosha, Wisconsin